Küsnət is a village in the Qabala Rayon of Azerbaijan. The village forms part of the municipality of Qəbələ.

References 

Populated places in Qabala District